George Feversham Arnold  (30 December 1914 – 31 January 1998)  was a Canadian Anglican bishop in the 20th century.

Arnold was educated at Dalhousie University and ordained in 1938.
He served at Louisbourg, St James Mahone Bay, St John's Fairview and Christ Church Windsor. He was bishop suffragan of Nova Scotia from 1967  to 1975, bishop coadjutor from May to September 1975 and its diocesan  until 1979.

References

1914 births
Dalhousie University alumni
20th-century Anglican Church of Canada bishops
Anglican bishops of Nova Scotia and Prince Edward Island
1998 deaths